Martin Cauchi Inglott is a Maltese politician. He was secretary-general of the Partit Demokratiku or Democratic Party of Malta and was formerly an officer in the Armed Forces of Malta.

References 

1967 births
Living people
Maltese military personnel
Democratic Party (Malta) politicians
21st-century Maltese politicians